Joseph Gonzales (19 February 1907 in Béni Saf, French Algeria – 26 June 1984) was a French football player. He won one international cap, against Belgium in 1936, and was an unused squad member for the 1934 World Cup.

Gonzales played club football for Valenciennes, Fives and Marseille. He was also the manager of Marseille in 1943 and 1944.

References

1907 births
1984 deaths
People from Béni Saf
Pieds-Noirs
French people of Spanish descent
French footballers
France international footballers
Valenciennes FC players
Olympique de Marseille players
Ligue 1 players
1934 FIFA World Cup players
French football managers
Olympique de Marseille managers
Association football defenders
SC Fives players
Migrants from French Algeria to France